Jakub Havlín (born 23 March 1979) is a Czech bobsledder. He competed in the two-man event at the 2018 Winter Olympics.

References

External links
 

1979 births
Living people
Czech male bobsledders
Olympic bobsledders of the Czech Republic
Bobsledders at the 2018 Winter Olympics
Place of birth missing (living people)